Flightlink Limited, trading as Flightlink Air Charters (Tanzania) Limited, is an airline based in the city of Dar es Salaam, The United Republic Of Tanzania offering scheduled flight services to the primary tourism and business centres across the country. In addition, it offers Air Charter and Medevac services on demand.

Flightlink was established in 2004 to develop and service the growing tourism requirements, and especially the 'safari' and Zanzibar archipelago destinations.  The company slogan  is We will fly you there, wherever there is!

Destinations
Scheduled flights are operated to the following destinations:

Fleet
The current Flightlink fleet consists of the following aircraft (as of June 2022):

References

External links
Official website

Airlines of Tanzania
Airlines established in 2004
2004 establishments in Tanzania